Balasore is a Vidhan Sabha constituency of Balasore district, Odisha.

Area of this constituency includes Balasore and 18 GPs (Kasipada, Rasulpur, Srirampur, Kasafal, Sartha, Bahabalpur, Chhanua, Haladipada, Olandasaragan, Odangi, Nagaram, Buanl, Sindhia, Gopinathpur, Parikhi, Patrapada, Kuradiha and Srikona) of Balasore block.

Elected Members

16 elections held during 1951 to 2019. Elected members from the Balasore constituency are:
2020 : Swarup Kumar Das (BJD) (By-Poll)
2019 : (38)   : Madanmohan Dutta (BJP). But he died in June 2020.
2014: (38): Jiban Pradip Dash (BJD)
2009: (38): Jiban Pradip Dash (BJD)
2004: (14): Arun Dey (OGP)
2000: (14): Jiban Pradip Dash (BJP)
1995: (14): Arun Dey (Independent)
1990: (14): Arun Dey (CPI)
1985: (14): Gopanarayan Das (Congress)
1980: (14): Arun Dey (CPI)
1977: (14): Kartik Chandar Rout (Janata Party)
1974: (14): Arun Dey (CPI)
1971: (14): Priyanath Nandy (Congress)
1967: (14): Rabindra Mohan Das (PSP)
1961: (127): Bijay Krishna Dey (Congress)
1957: (90): Rabindra Mohan Das (PSP)
1951: (55): Surendra Nath Dash (Congress)

Election results

2020 By-election

2019 Election Result
In 2019 election, Bharatiya Janata Party candidate Madan Mohan Dutta defeated BJD candidate Jiban Pradip Das by a margin of 13,406 votes.

2014 Election Result
In 2014 election, Biju Janata Dal candidate Jiban Pradip Das defeated BJP candidate Madan Mohan Dutta by a margin of 9,791 votes.

2009 Election Result
In 2009 election, Biju Janata Dal candidate Jiban Pradip Dash defeated Independent  candidate Anup Kumar Das by a margin of 13,490 votes.

Notes

References

Assembly constituencies of Odisha
Balasore